Jordin Sparks is an EP by American Idol season 6 winner Jordin Sparks. Sparks performed a song for the show each week of the season, and each song appeared on the show's website the day after the performance for sale as a studio version. The EP is a compilation of the four most downloaded of Sparks' songs, all of which are covers of other artists, plus "This Is My Now", an original single written by Jeff Peabody and Scott Krippayne, which she sang in the finale to win. It is considered as a promo EP for her debut full-length album.

Track listing
 "I (Who Have Nothing)" – 2:51
 "Wishing on a Star" – 3:41
 "To Love Somebody" – 3:35
 "A Broken Wing" – 3:38
 "This Is My Now" – 3:51

Charts

Album

Singles

References

19 Recordings EPs
2007 EPs
Jordin Sparks albums